Todd Arlan Lickliter (born April 17, 1955) is the former head coach of the Evansville Purple Aces men's basketball team of the Missouri Valley Conference (MVC). He was previously the head coach of Marian University, the University of Iowa, and Butler University men's basketball teams. He spent the 2011–12 season as an assistant coach at Miami (Ohio).

Early years
Lickliter was a starting point guard at North Central High School in Indianapolis, where he played for his father, Arlan. He helped North Central to a sectional title in Hinkle Fieldhouse in 1973, and he played his final high school game in the Fieldhouse in the 1974 sectional semifinals. Following his high school graduation, he enrolled at the University of North Carolina at Wilmington (UNCW) but wound up transferring to Central Florida Community College. He played one season at Central Florida, earning an associate degree in 1977, and then transferred to Butler, where he played his final two collegiate seasons, 1977–79. He earned a B.S. degree in secondary education from Butler in 1979.

Early coaching career 
Lickliter began his collegiate coaching career at Butler University in 1988–89 under his former college coach, Joe Sexson. He left the Bulldogs after a year to accept a head coaching job at Danville High School in Danville, Indiana, where he remained for three seasons. He returned to the collegiate ranks in 1996 as an administrative assistant on Barry Collier's staff. Lickliter accepted an assistant coaching position at Eastern Michigan in 1997 and remained on the Eagles' staff for two seasons, before returning to Butler in 1999. In six NCAA Division I seasons, he contributed to teams that won three conference regular season championships, four conference tournament titles, made four NCAA tournament appearances, and compiled a 106–73 record.

Lickliter played a prominent role in refining Butler's basketball system during his stint as assistant coach to Collier and Thad Matta. During his three seasons on the staff of the two former head coaches, the Bulldogs had three 20-win seasons, won three conference regular season titles, three league tournament crowns and three trips to the NCAA Tournament. In his final two seasons as a Butler assistant coach, the Bulldogs compiled a 47–18 record, including "Top 25" wins over #10 Wisconsin and #23 Wake Forest. The win over the Demon Deacons in the 2001 NCAA Men's Basketball Championship was Butler's first NCAA tournament win in 39 years.

Collegiate head coaching career

Butler Bulldogs 
In May 2001 Lickliter was named Butler University's 20th men's head basketball coach, replacing Thad Matta, who accepted the same position at Xavier University.  During his first season, Lickliter led the Bulldogs to a then-school record 26 victories and third consecutive Horizon League regular season championship.  They also cracked the Associated Press Top 25 rankings for the first time in 53 years.  The following year the Bulldogs surpassed their previous season's win total, finishing 27–6.  Lickliter's 53 wins during the first two years of his head coaching career rank third best in Division I history, behind Bill Guthridge (58 wins) of North Carolina and Everett Case (55 wins) of North Carolina State.  During his six years as head coach, he owned the top three single-season win totals in Butler basketball history and led the Bulldogs to the postseason four times, including two appearances in the NCAA Sweet 16.  In April 2007, the National Association of Basketball Coaches named Lickliter the National Coach of the Year. CollegeHoops.net also named Lickliter the High-Major Coach of the Year.

Iowa Hawkeyes 
Lickliter was introduced as the head coach at the University of Iowa on April 3, 2007, replacing Steve Alford. Iowa and Lickliter agreed to a 7-year deal at a salary of $1.2 million per year.  At the end of his 3rd year at Iowa, Lickliter was fired for poor performance. His record with the Hawkeyes was 38-58.

Marian Knights 
Lickliter returned to his hometown of Indianapolis, accepting the head coaching job at Marian University on June 6, 2012.

In his second season, Lickliter led the Knights to their most conference wins in school history (12).  
The Knights ended their season ranked #1 in NAIA Division II in Scoring Defense per Game (57.958), #1 in NAIA Division II in Turnover Margin (6.292), and #4 in NAIA Division II in Assist/Turnover Ratio (1.558).

Evansville Purple Aces 
After spending six seasons out of NCAA Division I college basketball, Lickliter was hired by first-year head coach Walter McCarty to be an assistant for the Evansville Purple Aces men's basketball team in the Missouri Valley Conference. Lickliter's former assistant, Matthew Graves, was also hired to be part of McCarty's staff. After McCarty was fired midway through his second season for sexual harassment and Title IX violations, Lickliter was hired as head coach on January 21, 2020. On May 5, 2022, Lickliter was fired by Evansville after compiling a 15-53 record.

Head coaching record

Family 
Lickliter and his wife, Joez, have three sons, Ry, Garrett and John, and three daughters-in-law, Magdalena, Molly, and Leah. Ry graduated from Marian University in 2006 and Garrett graduated in 2007. John, a 2012 graduate of Marian University, is an assistant coach for the Marian University Men's Basketball program.

References

External links
 Evansville profile

1955 births
Living people
American expatriate basketball people in Saudi Arabia
American men's basketball coaches
American men's basketball players
Basketball coaches from Indiana
Basketball players from Indianapolis
Boston Celtics scouts
Butler Bulldogs men's basketball coaches
Butler Bulldogs men's basketball players
College men's basketball head coaches in the United States
College of Central Florida Patriots men's basketball players
Eastern Michigan Eagles men's basketball coaches
Educators from Indiana
Evansville Purple Aces men's basketball coaches
High school basketball coaches in the United States
Iowa Hawkeyes men's basketball coaches
Junior college men's basketball players in the United States
Marian Knights men's basketball coaches
Miami RedHawks men's basketball coaches
Guards (basketball)